The 1931 Auckland Rugby League season was its 23rd.

The inaugural Fox Memorial Shield was won by Marist Old Boys who defeated Devonport United 12–5 in the final round to win by 2 competition points over the same side. This was Marists second ever first grade title after previously winning it in 1924. Devonport United did however win the Roope Rooster competition defeating Ponsonby United in the final. This was their second time winning the Roope Rooster after they won the inaugural title in 1915. They also beat Marist Old Boys to win the Stormont Shield Trophy for the second year in a row. Alongside these feats Devonport also won the inaugural reserve grade competition with a 5–5 draw in the final securing them the 1 competition point they needed to edge out Ponsonby United. Richmond Rovers won the Stallard Cup by winning the reserve grade knockout competition, defeating Newton Rangers reserves in the final 13–5.

On the final day of the season Mr. Samuel Harris of the Newton Rangers team had a heart attack while running with the ball in the final of the Seven-A-Side charity tournament. The game was called off with no result given. He had played with Newton for 2 seasons after moving to Auckland from Hikurangi. He was single and 26 years of age at the time.

Eastern Suburbs toured New Zealand at the end of the season and played 5 matches including 3 at Carlaw Park against Devonport, Devonport-Marist combined, and an Auckland Colts side.

Fox Memorial Shield replaces Monteith Shield 
It was the first season where the premier senior teams had competed for the Fox Memorial Shield. Prior to 1931 the trophy awarded was the Monteith Shield (1920–1930), and before that the Myers Cup (1910–14) (there were no trophies awarded during WW1 despite the first grade championship being competed for each season). The donor of the Monteith Shield had written to the league asking permission to withdraw the trophy from club competition and that the league play for a new trophy named after Edward Vincent Fox who had passed away the season previous and who had been heavily involved in Auckland Rugby League for a long period of time. The new trophy was being donated by friends of Fox. The trophy was finished and presented to the league in September. It was described thus; "measuring 27 inches across by 22 inches deep, the base is a handsome sample of polished rimu, with overlay of contrasting puriri, on which is an ornate centrepiece in oxidised silver depicting an incident of play in the New Zealand v Australia match of 1926". The donators of the trophy even went to the extent of sending the silver piece to England to have it effectively reproduced.

The Auckland City Council Parks Committee designated the following of its grounds to the league code: Auckland Domain (2), Outer Domain (1), Victoria Park, Auckland (1), Walker Road (2), Western Springs Reserve (1), Grey Lynn Park (1), and 1 additional ground at Grey Lynn to alternate between rugby and league.

Financial statement and annual report – From childhood to manhood 
The annual report to be filed at the annual general meeting showed that the league had a £9,711 5/9 surplus with total assets of £10,534 19/4. As there were smaller crowds in 1930 the gate receipts were £2,282 12/, down from £3,465 10/5 in 1929. The Junior Management Committee reported that the number of juniors registered was 1,930 compared with 984 the previous year, and 63 teams took the field. At the annual general meeting Mr. James Carlaw said that "this is a very important meeting, as we have now reached our twenty-first birthday, and have developed from childhood to manhood". Mr. Phelan presented trophies to the various winners from the previous season. At the Devonport annual meeting Mr. A. Ferguson who was a member of the New Zealand Council and who was presiding over the meeting said that the league game in New Zealand needed to follow the Australian model. He stated that they "demonstrated the value of physical fitness, which was produced by intensive, scientific training".

Senior competition restructuring and Carlaw Park gate takings 
A management committee meeting which also included the special committee setup the previous year to look into the restructuring of the Senior A and Senior B competitions adjusted their original plans. It had been decided at the end of the 1930 season to reduce the Senior A competition from eight teams to six, thus forcing teams into merging with one another. After the meeting this was adjusted to seven teams. The teams would be Devonport, Richmond Rovers, Ellerslie-Otahuhu (which also included the Mangere club, who could then choose their own name), Marist Old Boys, City, Newton, and Ponsonby United. The Kingsland team which had been removed from the A grade asked for permission to join with the Marist Old Boys.

The B grade (essentially the second division which had run from 1925–1930) was still to be eliminated. The league would encourage B grade players to try out for the reserve grade teams in the A grade clubs.

In a major development for the rugby league game in Auckland the special committee recommended that winning teams would be granted 12.5% of the net gate takings each weekend with losing teams sharing a "trifle less". The league would also enforce a rule where every Senior A club must field a reserve grade team "of sufficient calibre to satisfy the management committee". If they failed to do so they would be vulnerable to being removed from the A grade. The league also reserved the right to set the two lowest teams together at the end of the season against each other in a match and eliminating the losers, or compelling them to improve their standard of play or withdraw from the league.

Eastern Suburbs tour of New Zealand 
   In mid October the Eastern Suburbs club team from Sydney toured New Zealand. They began their tour with a match against Northland in Whangarei before meeting the Auckland championsDevonport at Carlaw Park the very next day. They then travelled to Hamilton where they played South Auckland while also fitting in a trip to see the sights of Rotorua. Eastern Suburbs then travelled back to Auckland where they played against a combined Marist-Devonport team who inflicted the touring sides only defeat with a 14-13 defeat before a crowd of 15,000. Their final match was against and an Auckland Colts side which included several current or future New Zealand internationals, namely Ted Mincham, Len Scott, Dick Smith, Wilf Hassan, Bert Leatherbarrow, and Ed St George before returning home with 4 wins and a loss.

Eastern Suburbs tour matches

Rule changes 
At the Management Committee meeting prior to the start of the season it was decided to adhere to the latest rules, where a team forcing the ball in their own in goal area would take a drop kick from the 25-yard line as opposed from their own try line. There was an adjustment to the weight allowance from the fourth grade down, and sixth grade players should be under 18 and a half on 1 May. At a following Management Committee meeting it was reported that the English Rugby League had advised that at scrum put in's the loose head would be transferred from the defending team to the attacking team.

On 15 August a referee was assaulted by a player after a match between the City and Newmarket Fourth Grade teams at Western Springs Stadium. He had ordered off a player from each team. The City player came back on the field and his team refused to remove him so the referee called the match off. He was then harassed by a number of players and one of them then fought with him, "the pair rolled on the ground fighting for a few minutes, the referee holding his own until some spectators intervened and separated" them.

New clubs at Papakura and Glenora, and several amalgamations 
On March 26 the Papakura Rugby League club was formed with 60 players enrolling. They applied to the Papakura Town Board for use of the reserve at Papakura. This was granted as the entire club had switched over from Rugby Union meaning they had no competition for the field. The council said that if a representative rugby game was being played on the field then the league team could use Prince Edward Park (which later became their home ground and remains so to this day). On Saturday, 18 April they played a practice match with Mount Wellington at Papakura. The match was won by Mt Wellington by 8 points to 5. Papakura's points came from an unconverted try to Johnstone, and I. Wilson kicked a penalty goal. They held their first social on the evening of Wednesday 22 April at the Paragon Theatre.

The Kingsland Athletic club joined with Marist meaning their senior players would join those of Marist. Kingsland were already an amalgamated club involving Kingsland Rovers and Grafton Athletic. This placed Marist as one of the early favourites to win the Senior Grade. This was discussed in an article on the prospects of all the teams in the New Zealand Herald.

The Ellerslie, Otahuhu, and Mangere clubs combined to form a senior team with the Mangere Senior B team being regraded to first junior with the team playing as part of the Ellerslie-Otahuhu side. However Mangere Rugby League Football Club then sent a deputation to a Management Committee meeting asking to be able to play as a separate institution as a junior club rather than be a part of the Ellerslie-Otahuhu amalgamation. They wished to be affiliated under their own name rather than amalgamate with Ellerslie. Several speakers from Mangere they said that they wished to play league football but maintain their own identity as a Māori team. The League said that there should be a conference with Ellerslie and in the meantime they would play for one week with Ellerslie. At a league meeting on 27 May the league decided to uphold their earlier ruling and enforce the amalgamation with the decision reviewed at the end of the season. It was expressed that the Mangere players were willing to play as the league suggested. Mr. Jim Rukutai suggested that Mangere be granted permission to retain their identity for twelve months, subject to all transfers being through the Ellerslie-Otahuhu United Club. The chairman of the league said "he did not think that there was any objection to Mangere playing as the Mangere section of the amalgamated club, but it was the duty of the League to uphold Ellerslie-Otahuhu Club". In the meantime he thought "moral suasion should be used by the members and the position would right itself". At the Management Committee meeting on 10 June it was reported by the chairman that the Mangere and Ellerslie clubs had reached a satisfactory agreement and that "the Māori senior team,… was willing to continue playing the league code. It was intended that Mangere should apply for the resignation of its players who had already played for Ellerslie" The matter would be deferred for one week.

It was announced at a City Rovers club meeting that the Parnell club had amalgamated with them. They would enter teams in the senior, reserve senior, first junior, third intermediate, fourth, fifth, sixth, and seventh grades, and also in the primary school competition. Ten of the Parnell senior B players were regraded to first class juniors and would play for that particular City Rovers side.

In June a new club was registered in the Glen Eden district and was named Glenora. They entered a team in the third grade intermediate.

Fox Memorial Shield (1st grade championship) 
The Senior Grade was reduced from 8 teams to 7 for the 1931 season. Each team had to field a reserve side and their matches were to be played prior to the A team's matches at the same venue.

Fox Memorial standings

References

External links 
 Auckland Rugby League Official Site

Auckland Rugby League seasons
Auckland Rugby League